Moorfleet is a quarter of Hamburg, Germany, in the borough of Bergedorf. It is located in the west of the borough.

Geography
Moorfleet is a part of the Marschlande and is located at the Dove Elbe river. The quarter is not highly populated and is mainly used for agriculture. However the western part of Moorfleet is a part of the industrial area of the Port of Hamburg.

Moorfleet borders the quarters Allermöhe, Tatenberg, Spadenland, Billwerder, Billbrook and Rothenburgsort.

Politics
These are the results of Moorfleet in the Hamburg state election in 2015:
 SPD 47.8% (− 0.6)
 CDU 19.5% (− 7.5)
 AfD 11.4% (+ 11.4)
 FDP 6.6% (+ 0.8)
 The Left 5.5% (+ 0.2)
 The Greens 5.2% (− 0.8)
 Others 3.6% (– 3.5)

Transportation
Moorfleet has no S-Bahn or U-Bahn station. However the Billwerder-Moorfleet station in Billbrook is nearby.

References

Quarters of Hamburg
Bergedorf